Federico Versaci (born 16 February 2002) is an Argentine professional footballer who plays as an right winger for Defensa y Justicia.

Club career
Versaci joined the Vélez Sarsfield academy at the age of five. He remained there for the entirety of his youth career, eventually making the move into senior football towards the end of 2020 under manager Mauricio Pellegrino. In November, he made the substitute's bench for a Copa Sudamericana win over Deportivo Cali and a Copa de la Liga Profesional defeat to Gimnasia y Esgrima; both at home. Versaci's professional debut soon arrived on 5 December in a fixture away to Patronato in the latter competition, as the player replaced Mauro Pittón with ten minutes remaining of a goalless draw.

On 8 July 2022, Versaci moved to Defensa y Justicia.

International career
Versaci represented Argentina at the 2017 South American U-15 Championship on home soil. He scored once, a penalty against Colombia, as they won the trophy. In March 2018, Versaci received a call-up from the U17s for a friendly with Huracán. He played in the match, though departed prematurely after suffering a ligament injury; which kept him out of action for almost a year. Further U17 calls arrived in 2019.

Career statistics
.

Honours
Argentina U15
South American U-15 Championship: 2017

Notes

References

External links

2002 births
Living people
Footballers from Buenos Aires
Argentine people of Italian descent
Argentine footballers
Argentina youth international footballers
Association football midfielders
Association football forwards
Argentine Primera División players
Club Atlético Vélez Sarsfield footballers
Defensa y Justicia footballers